In the New York City Subway there are three types of terminal stations:

 Station where a train proceeds beyond the station, like at a non-terminal station, and returns to service on another track.
 Station with one or more tracks, often with bumper blocks at their end. A train terminates on all applicable tracks and changes direction.
 Station where a train terminates on a track that is (or can be) also used as a through track.

Also, a station can be:

 terminal-only (like Flushing–Main Street (IRT Flushing Line))
 terminal for some services and through station for other services (like Bedford Park Boulevard (IND Concourse Line))

The listing 

This is a list of terminal stations on the New York City Subway. For all stations, see list of New York City Subway stations.

Terminal layout details 
For more information, see the track layout diagrams on the corresponding articles.

IRT

IND/BMT

See also

Notes

References

Further reading
 

New York City
Sub
 
New York City-related lists